Barry Elliot (born 24 October 1978) is a former professional footballer who played as a forward. Born in England, he represented Scotland at youth international level.

Career
Born in Carlisle, Elliot played in Scotland for Celtic Boys Club, Celtic, Clydebank, Dundee, Airdrieonians, Berwick Rangers, Partick Thistle, Stirling Albion and Linlithgow Rose.

References

1978 births
Living people
English footballers
Scottish footballers
Celtic F.C. players
Clydebank F.C. (1965) players
Dundee F.C. players
Airdrieonians F.C. (1878) players
Berwick Rangers F.C. players
Partick Thistle F.C. players
Stirling Albion F.C. players
Linlithgow Rose F.C. players
Scottish Football League players
Scottish Premier League players
Association football forwards
Footballers from Carlisle, Cumbria
Scotland under-21 international footballers